Rutland is a ceremonial county and unitary authority in the East Midlands, England. The county is bounded to the west and north by Leicestershire, to the northeast by Lincolnshire and the southeast by Northamptonshire.

It is the smallest historic county in England and the fourth smallest in the UK as a whole. Because of this, the Latin motto Multum in Parvo or "much in little" was adopted by the county council in 1950. It has the smallest population of any normal unitary authority in England. Among the current ceremonial counties, the Isle of Wight, City of London and City of Bristol are smaller in area.

The only towns in Rutland are Oakham, the county town, and Uppingham. At the centre of the county is Rutland Water, a large artificial reservoir that is an important nature reserve serving as an overwintering site for wildfowl and a breeding site for ospreys.

Rutland's older cottages are built from limestone or ironstone and many have roofs of Collyweston stone slate or thatch.

Etymology 
The origin of the name of the county is unclear. In a 1909 edition of Notes and Queries Harriot Tabor suggested "that the name should be Ruthland, and that there is a part of Essex called the Ruth, and that the ancient holders of it were called Ruthlanders, since altered to Rutland"; however, responses suggest "that Rutland, as a name, was earlier than the Norman Conquest. Its first mention, as "Roteland", occurs in the will of Edward the Confessor; in Domesday it is "the King's soc of Roteland", not being then a shire; and in the reign of John it was assigned as a dowry to Queen Isabella.

The northwestern part of the county was recorded as Rutland, a detached part of Nottinghamshire, in Domesday Book; the south-eastern part as the wapentake of Wicelsea in Northamptonshire. It was first mentioned as a separate county in 1159, but as late as the 14th century it was referred to as the 'Soke of Rutland'. Rutlandshire is an archaic and rarely used alternative name.

Rutland may be from Old English  or  "cattle" and  "land", as a record from 1128 as Ritelanede shows. However, A Dictionary of British Place-Names by A D Mills gives an alternative etymology, "Rota's land", from the Old English (Anglo-Saxon) personal name and land land. It is from the alternative interpretation of red land that the traditional nickname for a male person from Rutland, a "Raddle Man", derives.

History

Earl of Rutland and Duke of Rutland are titles in the peerage of England held in the Manners family, derived from the historic county of Rutland. The Earl of Rutland was elevated to the status of Duke in 1703 and the titles were merged. The family seat is Belvoir Castle, Leicestershire.

The office of High Sheriff of Rutland was instituted in 1129, and there has been a Lord Lieutenant of Rutland since at least 1559. Oakham Castle was built c.1180–1190 and is "one of the nation’s best-preserved Norman buildings" and is a Grade I listed building.

By the time of the 19th century it had been divided into the hundreds of Alstoe, East Rutland, Martinsley, Oakham and Wrandike.

Rutland covered parts of three poor law unions and rural sanitary districts (RSDs): those of Oakham, Uppingham and Stamford. The registration county of Rutland contained the entirety of Oakham and Uppingham RSDs, which included several parishes in Leicestershire and Northamptonshire – the eastern part in Stamford RSD was included in the Lincolnshire registration county. Under the Poor Laws, Oakham Union workhouse was built in 1836–37 at a site to the north-east of the town, with room for 100 paupers. The building later operated as the Catmose Vale Hospital, and now forms part of the Oakham School.

In 1894 under the Local Government Act 1894 the rural sanitary districts were partitioned along county boundaries to form three rural districts. The part of Oakham and Uppingham RSDs in Rutland formed the Oakham Rural District and Uppingham Rural District, with the two parishes from Oakham RSD in Leicestershire becoming part of the Melton Mowbray Rural District, the nine parishes of Uppingham RSD in Leicestershire becoming the Hallaton Rural District, and the six parishes of Uppingham RSD in Northamptonshire becoming Gretton Rural District. Meanwhile, that part of Stamford RSD in Rutland became the Ketton Rural District.

Oakham Urban District was created from Oakham Rural District in 1911. It was subsequently abolished in 1974.

Rutland was included in the "East Midlands General Review Area" of the 1958–67 Local Government Commission for England. Draft recommendations would have seen Rutland split, with Ketton Rural District going along with Stamford to a new administrative county of Cambridgeshire, and the western part added to Leicestershire. The final proposals were less radical and instead proposed that Rutland become a single rural district within the administrative county of Leicestershire.

District of Leicestershire (1974–1997)
Rutland became a non-metropolitan district of Leicestershire under the Local Government Act 1972, which took effect on 1 April 1974. The original proposal was for Rutland to be merged with what is now the Melton borough, as Rutland did not meet the requirement of having a population of at least 40,000. The revised and implemented proposals allowed Rutland to be exempt from this.

Unitary authority (1997–present)
In 1994, the Local Government Commission for England, which was conducting a structural review of English local government, recommended that Rutland become a unitary authority. This was implemented on 1 April 1997, when Rutland County Council became responsible for almost all local services in Rutland, with the exception of the Leicestershire Fire and Rescue Service and Leicestershire Police, which are run by joint boards with Leicestershire County Council and Leicester City Council. Rutland regained a separate lieutenancy and shrievalty, and thus also regained status as a ceremonial county.

Rutland was a postal county until the Royal Mail integrated it into the Leicestershire postal county in 1974. After a lengthy campaign, and despite counties no longer being required for postal purposes, the Royal Mail agreed to re-create a postal county of Rutland in 2007. This was achieved in January 2008 by amending the former postal county for all of the Oakham (LE15) post town and a small part of the Market Harborough (LE16) post town.

Politics and subdivisions

Wards
As from the May 2019 elections, there are 27 councillors representing 15 wards on Rutland County Council. They represent a mixture of one, two and three-person wards.

Parliamentary constituency
Rutland formed a Parliamentary constituency on its own until 1918, when it became part of the Rutland and Stamford constituency, along with Stamford in Lincolnshire. Since 1983 it has formed part of the Rutland and Melton constituency along with Melton borough and part of Harborough district from Leicestershire.

As of the 2019 general election, Alicia Kearns is the member of parliament for Rutland and Melton, having received 62.6% of the vote.

Civil parishes

The county comprises 57 civil parishes, which range considerably in size and population, from Martinsthorpe (nil population) to Oakham (10,922 residents in the 2011 census).

Demographics 

The population in the 2011 Census was 37,369, a rise of 8% on the 2001 total of 34,563. This is a population density of 98 people per square kilometre. 2.7% of the population are from ethnic minority backgrounds compared to 9.1% nationally. In terms of religious affiliation, around 68.2% are of Christian faith, with "No religion" being around 22.9%. 0.4% are of Islamic faith and other religions at less than 1%.

In 2006 it was reported that Rutland has the highest fertility rate of any English county – the average woman having 2.81 children, compared with only 1.67 in Tyne and Wear.

In December 2006, Sport England published a survey which revealed that residents of Rutland were the 6th most active in England in sports and other fitness activities. 27.4% of the population participate at least 3 times a week for 30 minutes.

In 2012, the well-being report by the Office for National Statistics found Rutland to be the "happiest county" in the mainland UK.

Geography

The particular geology of the area has given its name to the Rutland Formation which was formed from muds and sand carried down by rivers and occurring as bands of different colours, each with many fossil shells at the bottom. At the bottom of the Rutland Formation is a bed of dirty white sandy silt. Under the Rutland Formation is a formation called the Lincolnshire limestone. The best exposure of this limestone (and also the Rutland Formation) is at the Ketton Cement Works quarry just outside Ketton.

Rutland is dominated by Rutland Water, a large artificial lake formerly known as "Empingham Reservoir", in the middle of the county, which is almost bisected by the Hambleton Peninsula. The west part is in the Vale of Catmose. Rutland Water, when construction started in 1971, became Europe's largest man-made lake; construction was completed in 1975, and filling the lake took a further four years. This has been voted Rutland's favourite tourist attraction.

The highest point of the county is at Cold Overton Park (historically part of Flitteriss Park) at 197 m (646 ft) above sea level close to the west border (OS Grid reference: SK8271708539). The lowest point is close to the east border, in secluded farmland at North Lodge Farm, northeast of Belmesthorpe, at just 17 m (56 feet) above sea level (OS Grid reference: TF056611122); this corner of the county is on the edge of The Fens and is drained by the West Glen.

Rivers
River Chater
Eye Brook
River Gwash
River Welland

Economy

There are 17,000 people of working age in Rutland, of which the highest percentage (30.8%) work in Public Administration, Education and Health, closely followed by 29.7% in Distribution, Hotels and Restaurants and 16.7% in Manufacturing industries. Significant employers include Lands' End in Oakham and the Ketton Cement Works. Other employers in Rutland include two Ministry of Defence bases – Kendrew Barracks (formerly RAF Cottesmore) and St George's Barracks (previously RAF North Luffenham), two public schools – Oakham and Uppingham – and one prison, Stocken.  The former Ashwell prison closed at the end of March 2011 after a riot and government review but, having been purchased by Rutland County Council, has now been turned into Oakham Enterprise Park.  The county used to supply iron ore to Corby steel works but these quarries closed in the 1960s and early 1970s resulting in the famous walk of "Sundew" (the Exton quarries' large walking dragline) from Exton to Corby, which even featured on the children's TV series Blue Peter. Agriculture thrives with much wheat farming on the rich soil. Tourism continues to grow.

The Ruddles Brewery was Langham's biggest industry until it was closed in 1997.  Rutland bitter is one of only three UK beers to have achieved Protected Geographical Indication status; this followed an application by Ruddles. When Greene King, the owners of Ruddles, closed the Langham brewery it was unable to take advantage of the registration. However, in 2010 a Rutland Bitter was launched by Oakham's Grainstore Brewery.

It is 348th out of 354 on the Indices of Deprivation for England, showing it to be one of the least economically deprived areas in the country.

In March 2007, Rutland became only the fourth Fairtrade County.

This is a chart of trend of regional gross value added of the non-metropolitan county of Leicestershire and Rutland at current basic prices with figures in millions of British Pounds Sterling.

 includes hunting and forestry

 includes energy and construction

 includes financial intermediation services indirectly measured

 Components may not sum to totals due to rounding

As far as the NHS is concerned Rutland is generally treated as part of Leicestershire.

Transport
A small part of the East Coast Main Line passes through Rutland's north-east corner, near Essendine.

Rutland was the last county in England without a direct rail service to London (apart from the Isle of Wight and several administrative counties which are unitary authorities). East Midlands Trains started running a single service from Oakham railway station to London St Pancras via Corby on 27 April 2009.

Through the Rutland Electric Car Project, Rutland was the first county to offer a county-wide public electric-vehicle charging network.

In popular culture 
Rutland's small size has led to a number of humorous references such as Rutland Weekend Television, a television comedy sketch series hosted by Eric Idle. The county is the supposed home of the parody rock band The Rutles, who first appeared on Rutland Weekend Television.

The events in several Peter F. Hamilton books (including Misspent Youth and Mindstar Rising) are situated in Rutland, where the author lives. Adam Croft is writing the Rutland crime series, beginning with What Lies Beneath (2020).

Rutland was the last county in England without a McDonald's restaurant. However, in January 2020 a planning application for a McDonald's restaurant on the outskirts of Oakham was approved by the County Council and the restaurant opened on 4 November 2020.

Traditions 
Rutland's traditions include:
Letting of the Banks (Whissendine): The Banks are pasture land and the letting traditionally occurs in the third week of March
Rush Bearing and Rush Strewing (Barrowden): Reeds are gathered in the church meadow on the eve of St Peter's Day and placed on the church floor (late June, early July)
Uppingham Market was granted by Charter in 1281 by Edward I.
According to tradition, any royalty or peers passing through Oakham must present a horseshoe to the Lord of the Manor of Oakham. The horseshoe has been Rutland's emblem for hundreds of years.

Education 

Harington School provides post-16 education in the county. Rutland County College closed in 2017.

Places of interest 
Barnsdale Gardens
Lyddington Bede House
Oakham Castle 
Rutland County Museum, Oakham
Rutland Railway Museum, Ashwell 
Rutland Water 
Tolethorpe Hall
The Viking Way
Rutland Water Nature Reserve

See also
Flag of Rutland
High Sheriff of Rutland
List of birds of Leicestershire and Rutland
Lord Lieutenant of Rutland
Kesteven
Parts of Holland
Soke of Peterborough

References

Bibliography

External links

Rutland County Council
Rutland Local History & Record Society

Unitary authority districts of England
East Midlands
Local government districts of the East Midlands
Counties of England established in antiquity
Counties of England disestablished in 1974
Counties of England established in 1997